Jörg Haas (born 27 February 1968) is a German middle-distance runner. He competed in the men's 800 metres at the 1992 Summer Olympics. He was the 1992 800 metres national champion at the German Athletics Championships.

References

External links
 

1968 births
Living people
Athletes (track and field) at the 1992 Summer Olympics
German male middle-distance runners
Olympic athletes of Germany
People from Offenburg
Sportspeople from Freiburg (region)
20th-century German people